Lukaviatrans is a Russian charter airline based at Maksimovo Airport, Pskov, which carries out aerial photography, aerial chemical work (e.g. crop spraying), aerial fire-fighting, aircraft maintenance, oil and gas pipeline monitoring, and crop clearance around pipelines.

Fleet

References

External links
Official website (Russian)

Airlines of Russia
Companies based in Pskov Oblast